Yoseph Ostanika Malau or Nico Malau (born 19 March 1991) is an Indonesian professional footballer who plays as a forward for Liga 2 club PSMS Medan.

Honours

Club
Semen Padang
Indonesian Community Shield: 2013

References

External links
 Yoseph Ostanika Malau at Soccerway
 Yoseph Ostanika Malau at ligaindonesiabaru

1991 births
Living people
People of Batak descent
Indonesian footballers
PSMS Medan players
Semen Padang F.C. players
Persiba Balikpapan players
Persiwa Wamena players
Liga 1 (Indonesia) players
Liga 2 (Indonesia) players
People from Binjai
Sportspeople from North Sumatra
Association football forwards